Brian Reitzell (born December 24, 1965) is an American musician, composer, record producer and music supervisor best known for his work on many film and TV soundtracks. He is notable for working extensively with the American film director Sofia Coppola (The Virgin Suicides, Lost in Translation, Marie Antoinette, The Bling Ring). He was formerly the drummer for the LA punk band Redd Kross. He has collaborated extensively with the French electronica duo Air, having performed drums on their albums The Virgin Suicides and 10 000 Hz Legend. Reitzell also toured with the band on their "Moon Safari" tour in 1998 and again in 2000 and 2001. In 2003 he was nominated for a BAFTA, along with Kevin Shields of My Bloody Valentine, for the score to Lost in Translation.

He is a member of the (side project) synth pop band TV Eyes alongside Roger Joseph Manning, Jr. and Jason Falkner.

In 2012 Reitzell scored Turner Prize winning UK artist Elizabeth Price's video installation, "West Hinder".

His first solo album, Auto Music, was released by Smalltown Supersound on June 17, 2014.

Works

Discography
Auto Music (2014, Smalltown Supersound)

References

External links

 Evolution Music Partners -- agent

American rock drummers
American film score composers
American male film score composers
Record producers from California
Redd Kross members
Living people
1965 births
20th-century American drummers
American male drummers
20th-century American male musicians
Smalltown Supersound artists
Ipecac Recordings artists